Nerita striata is a species of sea snail, a marine gastropod mollusk in the family Neritidae.

Description

Distribution

References

 Tsi, C. Y. & Ma, S. T. (1982). A preliminary checklist of the marine gastropoda and Bivalvia (Mollusca) of Hong Kong and southern China. In: Proceedings of the first international marine biological workshop: The marine flora and fauna of Hong Kong and southern China (ed. Morton, B.), vol. 1, pp431-458. Hong Kong University Press, Hong Kong.

Neritidae
Gastropods described in 1841